The Jurong railway station was a freight railway station that was co-owned by JTC Corporation, one of Singapore's primary industry-based developers, and Keretapi Tanah Melayu (the KTM), the national railroad company of Malaysia.

History
In the 1960s, when the Singapore government decided that the area of Jurong was to be the site for Singapore's second port (after the existing one at Tanjong Pagar south of the city-centre) and a new industrial estate, it was realized that most of Jurong lacked proper roads and related infrastructure (as the area was, at that time, largely undeveloped and was regarded as a rural district, with many farms and villages (kampongs) scattered across the jungles and swamps in the area). Therefore, an agreement was struck between Singapore and Malaysia for the extension of a railroad line from the Bukit Timah railway station on the main KTM-operated railroad line between Malaysia and the Tanjong Pagar railway station near the city-district of Singapore towards the newly established industrial estate and Jurong Port.

The construction of the Jurong railway station and the so-called "Jurong Line" (the unofficial name for the new railway line for freight transport) started in 1963 and was completed in 1965 amidst much public fanfare, even though the railway line was not intended to be catered for passenger-based train services. Despite the significant investment in the establishment of the "Jurong Line" with its relevant infrastructure and the general notion amongst the population at large that it would play an important role in serving Jurong's industrial estate and the port through freight-based railroad transportation, there was not much true worth in the "Jurong Line" (only a few industrial operators based in the surrounding area made use of the railway line for its original (and sole) purpose of transporting freight; these included the Sugar Industries of Singapore (SIS) Ltd., Asia Cement (Malaysia) Ltd., the Pan Malaysian Cement Works Ltd. and Exxon Mobil Asia Pacific Pte Ltd). Thus, throughout the entire duration of its existence, the activity level of the "Jurong Line" was generally quite low.

Eventually, as bilateral relations between Singapore and Malaysia became particularly strained over the years since 1965 (especially so after the expulsion of Singapore from Malaysia in that same year), and with more and more good roads and other relevant infrastructure being built leading to Jurong Port, the neighbouring industrial estate and the petro-chemical industrial complex on Jurong Island, freight-based railway services on the "Jurong Line" were finally terminated in 1992, with the Jurong railway station itself being demolished in 1993.

Remnants
In 2010, some remains of the tracks of the "Jurong Line" were dismantled by the KTM to replace the damaged rails in Bukit Timah railway station where a significant derailment accident occurred. The same year saw the Jurong station's destination signboard removed and lost and most of the remaining tracks were dismantled by the Singapore Land Authority (SLA) between August to September 2011 after the Tanjong Pagar railway station closed on 1 July that year. Only the old bridges atop the Ulu Pandan River, above a road at Sunset Way, beside Jalan Ahmad Ibrahim, before and after the Shipyard Road railroad crossing and above a river at Tanjong Kling along with tunnel crossings through Clementi (between an estate at Sunset Way and Maju Camp), the Teban Flyover and a major roundabout under the Jurong Island Bridge still exist. Much of the land where the old railway line runs have either been taken over by new (mainly industrial) developments in the Jurong area or are simply left abandoned and awaiting future use, and many smaller bridges on which the line runs have also disappeared over the years since 2011.

References

Railway stations in Singapore opened in 1965
Defunct railway stations in Singapore
Railway stations closed in 1993
Defunct railway stations in Malaysia